5α-Dihydrocortisol (5α-DHF), also known as hydrallostane or as allodihydrocortisol, is a metabolite of cortisol that is formed by 5α-reductase. It is present in the aqueous humor of the eye, is produced in the lens of the eye, and be involved in regulating the formation of the aqueous humor. 5α-DHF can be further metabolized into 3α,5α-tetrahydrocortisol by 3α-hydroxysteroid dehydrogenase.

References

Diketones
Human metabolites
Pregnanes
Triols